Yeonsu Station is a subway station on the Korail-operated Suin Line in Yeonsu-gu, Incheon, which opened on June 30, 2012.

Metro stations in Incheon
Seoul Metropolitan Subway stations
Railway stations opened in 2012
Yeonsu District